The papal conclave held from 16 to 18 December 1352 was convened after the death of Pope Clement VI and elected as his successor Cardinal Etienne Aubert. The fifth pope of the period of the Avignon Papacy, he took the name Innocent VI. This conclave is remarkable because during its celebration cardinals for the first time in history subscribed the electoral capitulation, which limited the power of elect.

List of participants

Pope Clement VI died on December 6, 1352 at Avignon. During his pontificate he constantly refused to return to Rome and purchased the sovereignty of Avignon (where resided papal court) from Queen Joan I of Naples. At the time of his death, there were 26 living cardinals. 25 of them participated in the conclave:

Nineteen electors were created by Pope Clement VI, and eight of them were his relatives. Of the remaining six three were creatures of John XXII and three of Benedict XII.

The post of Camerlengo of the Holy Roman Church, the most important during sede vacante, was occupied by Stefano Aldebrandi Cambaruti, archbishop of Toulouse (not a Cardinal).

Absentee 

One cardinal created by Clement VI did not participate in this conclave, because he served as legate in France, where he unsuccessfully tried to establish peace between the Kingdom of France and the Kingdom of England in the Hundred Years' War:

First conclave capitulation in history

On December 16 twenty five cardinals entered the conclave in the Palais des Papes in Avignon. Initially, all the electors subscribed the first conclave capitulation in the history, although several of them (including Cardinal Aubert) made this with reservation, insofar as it was not contrary to church law”. The terms of capitulation were following:

	College of Cardinals limited to 20; no new cardinals until only 16 remained.
	Two-thirds of College needed to approve creating, excommunicating, depriving of suffrage, or reducing the property or revenue of cardinals, or to request subsidies from sovereigns or national clergies.
	College granted veto power of papal decisions and policies.
	All papal revenue shared with College.

Subscription of this capitulation is considered as part of the general strategy of the College of Cardinals to limit papal power and to transform the government of the Church into oligarchy instead of monarchy.

Election of Pope Innocent VI 

After subscribing the capitulation cardinals started electoral proceedings. Initially, the candidature of Jean Birel, general of the Order of Carthusians, non-cardinal, venerated for his holiness, was proposed. But Cardinal Talleyrand addressed to the Sacred College that it would be unwise, if not dangerous, in such critical circumstances in Europe to elect new Celestine V, it means, a saintly but wholly incompetent Pontiff. The electors eventually agreed with him and abandoned the candidature of Birel in favor of Cardinal Etienne Aubert, bishop of Ostia, who on December 18 was unanimously elected Pope. He accepted his election and took the name of Innocent VI. On December 30 he was solemnly crowned in the cathedral of Notre Dame des Doms in Avignon by Cardinal Gaillard de la Mothe, protodeacon of S. Lucia in Silice.

On July 6, 1353 Pope Innocent VI declared the capitulation agreed by the conclave invalid as violating the rule restricting business during a conclave to the election of the new pope and as infringing the plenitude of power inherent in the papal office. In spite of this, electoral capitulations were subscribed in the majority of the conclaves held in the next 300 years.

See also 
 Conclave capitulation

References

References
Salvador Miranda: list of participants of the papal conclave of 1352
Pope Innocent VI
G. Mollat The Popes at Avignon 1305-1378, London 1963
Kelly, J.N.D. The Oxford Dictionary of Popes, Oxford, 1986

1352
14th-century elections
1352
Avignon Papacy
14th-century Catholicism
14th century in Europe